This is a list of fossiliferous stratigraphic units in Alberta, Canada.

References

 
 
 Glass, D.J. (editor) 1997. Lexicon of Canadian Stratigraphy, vol. 4, Western Canada including eastern British Columbia, Alberta, Saskatchewan and southern Manitoba. Canadian Society of Petroleum Geologists, Calgary, 1423 p. on CD-ROM. .
 

Alberta
Geology of Alberta
Stratigraphy of Alberta